I Will Go is the third album released by the Christian music band Starfield.

Track listing 
"From the Corners of the Earth" - 3:42
"Hosanna" - 4:04
"Reign in Us" - 5:34
"Holy Is Our God" - 5:33
"I Will Go" - 3:17
"Remain" - 4:56
"All We Need" - 5:31
"Great in All the Earth" - 4:48
"The Loveliest Sound" - 4:11
"Hiding Place" - 4:34

Credits
 Bob Boyd — mastering
 Lee Bridges — mixing
 Ed Cash — guitar, producer, engineer, mixing
 Jesse Chambers — A&R
 Rob Hawkins — guitar
 Chris Janz — assistant engineer
 Tony Lucido — bass guitar
 Jon Neufeld — electric guitar, vocals, group member
 Tim Neufeld — acoustic guitar, vocals, group member
 Brad O'Donnell — A&R
 Allen Salmon — guitar, programming, backing vocals, producer, engineer, mixing, drum engineering
 Matt Stanfield — programming
 Andy Walker — programming, production assistant

References

2008 albums
Starfield (band) albums
Sparrow Records albums